Course v. Stead, 4 U.S. (4 Dall.) 22 (1800), was an 1800 decision of the United States Supreme Court asserting that "A writ of error, tested in the vacation after the last term, is amendable. The omission of the name of the district in the address of the writ is not material if the indorsement and attestation show the district. If the value of the matter in dispute does not appear, it may be shown by affidavit. If a new party and subject-matter are brought before the court by a supplemental bill, it must show that the court has jurisdiction by reason of the citizenship of the parties to that bill."

See also
 List of United States Supreme Court cases, volume 4

References

External links
 

United States Supreme Court cases
United States Supreme Court cases of the Ellsworth Court
1800 in United States case law